Joseph Michael "Joe" Acabá (born May 17, 1967) is a Puerto Rican educator, hydrogeologist, and NASA astronaut. In May 2004 he became the first person of Puerto Rican heritage to be named as a NASA astronaut candidate, when he was selected as a member of NASA Astronaut Training Group 19. He completed his training on February 10, 2006, and was assigned to STS-119, which flew from March 15 to 28, 2009, to deliver the final set of solar arrays to the International Space Station.

Acabá served as a flight engineer aboard the International Space Station, having launched on May 15, 2012. He arrived at the space station on May 17 and returned to Earth on September 17, 2012. Acaba returned to the International Space Station in 2017 as a member of Expedition 53/54. In 2023, Acaba was appointed the Chief of the Astronaut Office.

Early years 
Acaba's parents, Ralph and Elsie Acabá, from Hatillo, Puerto Rico, moved in the mid-1960s to Inglewood, California, where he was born. They later moved to Anaheim, California. Since his childhood, Acaba enjoyed reading, especially science fiction. In school, he excelled in both science and math. As a child, his parents constantly exposed him to educational films, but it was the 8-mm film showing astronaut Neil Armstrong's Moon landing which really intrigued him about outer space. During his senior year in high school, Acaba became interested in scuba diving and became a certified scuba diver through a job training program at his school. This experience inspired him to further his academic education in the field of geology. In 1985, he graduated with honors from Esperanza High School in Anaheim.

Education 
In 1990, Acaba received his bachelor's degree in geology from the University of California, Santa Barbara and in 1992, he earned his master's degree in geology from the University of Arizona. Acaba was a sergeant in the United States Marine Corps Reserve where he served for six years. He also worked as a hydrogeologist in Los Angeles, California. Acaba spent two years in the United States Peace Corps and trained over 300 teachers in the Dominican Republic in modern teaching methodologies. He then served as island manager of the Caribbean Marine Research at Lee Stocking Island in the Exumas, Bahamas.

Upon his return to the United States, Acaba moved to Florida, where he became shoreline revegetation coordinator in Vero Beach. He taught one year of science and math in high school and four years at Dunnellon Middle School. He also briefly taught at Melbourne High School in Melbourne, Florida. Upon his return to Florida in fall 2012, Acaba began coursework in the College of Education at Texas Tech University. He earned his Master of Education, curriculum and instruction from Texas Tech University in 2015.

NASA career 

On May 6, 2004, Acaba and ten other people were selected from 99 applicants by NASA as astronaut candidates. NASA's administrator, Sean O'Keefe, in the presence of John Glenn, announced the members of the "19th group of Astronaut Candidates", an event which has not been repeated since 1958 when the original group of astronauts was presented to the world. Acaba, who was selected as an Educator Mission Specialist, completed his astronaut training on February 10, 2006, along with the other ten astronaut candidates. Upon completion of his training, Acaba was assigned to the Hardware Integration Team in the International Space Station branch, working technical issues with European Space Agency (ESA) hardware.

STS-119
Acaba was assigned to the crew of STS-119 as mission specialist educator, which was launched on March 15, 2009, at 7:43 p.m., after NASA engineers repaired a leaky gas venting system the previous week, to deliver the final set of solar arrays to the International Space Station. Acaba, who carried on his person a Puerto Rican flag, requested that the crew be awakened on March 19 (Day 5) with the Puerto Rico folklore song "Qué Bonita Bandera" (What a Beautiful Flag) referring to the Puerto Rican flag, written in 1971 by Florencio Morales Ramos (Ramito) and sung by Jose Gonzalez and Banda Criolla.

On March 20, he provided support to the first mission spacewalk and on March 21, he performed a spacewalk with Steve Swanson in which he helped to successfully unfurl the final "wings" of the solar array that will augment power to the ISS. 2 days later, Acaba performed his second EVA of the mission, with crew member Ricky Arnold. The main task of the EVA was to help move the CETA carts on the outside of the station to a different location. EDT. Acaba said he was amazed at the views from the space station.

Expedition 31/32
On May 15, 2012, Acaba was one of three crew members launching from Kazakhstan aboard the Soyuz TMA-04M spacecraft to the International Space Station. He and his fellow crew members, Gennady Padalka and Sergei Revin, arrived and docked with the space station two days after launch, on May 17 at 4:36 UTC. Acaba, along with Padalka and Revin, returned to Earth on September 17, 2012, after nearly 125 days in space.

Between space missions
Acaba served as the Branch Chief of the International Space Station Operations branch. The office is responsible for mission preparation and on-orbit support of space station crews.
Until being selected as flight engineer for Expedition 54\Expedition 55 Acaba served as Director of Operations Russia in Star City supporting crew training in Soyuz and Russian Segment systems.

In September 2019 Acaba served as cavenaut in ESA CAVES training (between Italy and Slovenia) spending six nights underground simulating a mission exploring another planet.

Expedition 53/54
In 2017 it was announced that Acaba would be returning to the ISS for his third mission, onboard Soyuz MS-06. The Soyuz vehicle was originally slated to launch with a crew of 2, due to the Russian crew cuts on the ISS for 2017, however, at short notice, it was decided that the 3rd seat would be filled by an experienced astronaut and would be funded by Roscosmos to cancel out owed debts. Acaba's backup for the mission was Shannon Walker, who was scheduled to fly as prime crew on Soyuz MS-12 as part of Expedition 59/60, although as of December 2018, she is not assigned to that crew

Acaba launched on Soyuz MS-06 on September 12, 2017, performing a 6-hour rendezvous with the ISS. On October 20, 2017, Acaba and Randy Bresnik performed an EVA to continue with the lubrication of the new end effector on the robotic arm, and to install new cameras. The duration was 6 hours and 49 minutes. During the mission Acaba's home in Houston was flooded by Hurricane Harvey and Hurricane Maria struck his native Puerto Rico.

Statistics

Chief of the Astronaut Office 

In 2023, Acaba became Chief of the Astronaut Office at NASA. He replaced Drew Feustel who was acting Chief of the Astronaut Office.

Recognition 

On March 18, 2008, Acaba was honored by the Senate of Puerto Rico, which sponsored his first trip to the Commonwealth of Puerto Rico since being selected for space flight.  During his visit, which was announced by then President of the Puerto Rican Senate,  Kenneth McClintock, he met with schoolchildren at the Capitol, as well as at the Bayamón, Puerto Rico Science Park, which includes a planetarium and several surplus NASA rockets among its exhibits.

Acaba returned to Puerto Rico on June 1, 2009. During his visit, he was presented with a proclamation by then Governor Luis Fortuño. He spent seven days on the island and came into contact with over 10,000 persons, most of them schoolchildren.

He received the Ana G. Mendez University System Presidential Medal and an Honorary Doctorate from the Polytechnic University of Puerto Rico, where he inaugurated a flight simulator on February 7, 2013, during one of his visits to Puerto Rico to promote the study of math and science among students, as well as to visit his relatives. Caras Magazine named him one of the most influential and exciting Puerto Ricans of 2012.

See also

References

External links 

 
 Spacefacts biography of Joseph Acaba
 NASA biography
 Video of NASA HQ Social event December 2012

1967 births
Living people
American people of Puerto Rican descent
Educator astronauts
Peace Corps volunteers
People from Anaheim, California
People from Inglewood, California
Hispanic and Latino American educators
Puerto Rican United States Marines
Texas Tech University alumni
United States Marines
United States Marine Corps astronauts
United States Marine Corps reservists
University of California, Santa Barbara alumni
NASA civilian astronauts
Aquanauts
American expatriates in the Dominican Republic
Space Shuttle program astronauts
Hispanic and Latino American scientists
Spacewalkers
Military personnel from California
Puerto Rican aviators